In Norse mythology, Narfi is a son of Loki, referred to in a number of sources. According to the Gylfaginning section of Snorri Sturluson's Prose Edda, he was also called Nari and was killed by his brother Váli, who was transformed into a wolf; in a prose passage at the end of the Eddic poem "Lokasenna", Narfi became a wolf and his brother Nari was killed.

Textual mentions
In chapter 50 of Gylfaginning, to punish Loki for his crimes, the Æsir turn his son Váli into a wolf and he dismembers his brother, "Nari or Narfi", whose entrails are then used to bind their father.

The prose colophon to "Lokasenna" has a summary of the same story, probably derived from Snorri; In this version, there is no mention of a brother named Váli, Nari is the brother who is killed, Narfi transforms into a wolf, and the connection is not explained. The name Narfi has often been changed to Váli to better conform to the Prose Edda account; for example in Guðni Jónsson's 1954 edition and in Henry Adams Bellows' 1923 English translation.

Snorri also names "Nari or Narfi" as the son of Loki and his wife Sigyn earlier in Gylfaginning, and lists "father of Nari" as a heiti for Loki in the Skáldskaparmál section of his work. In addition, Narfi is mentioned in the much earlier "Ynglingatal" of Þjóðólfr of Hvinir, where Hel is referred to by the kenning jóðís ulfs ok Narfa ("sister of the wolf [i.e. Fenrir] and Narfi"), and in the "Haustlöng", which may be by the same skald. 

Narfi also occurs as a personal name. For example, a Norwegian bishop and king's counselor who died in 1304 was named Narve.

Interpretations
The picture is confused, making it uncertain whether Nari and Narfi are the same, and how he or they relate to the father of Nótt, the personification of night, who is also sometimes called Narfi. The name has been interpreted as meaning "narrow", but Rudolf Simek suggests that the association with Hel and the use of the same name for Nótt's father indicate that Narfi may have "originally [been] a demon of the dead" and that his name could be related to the Old Norse word nár, "corpse", which gave rise to Náströnd and Naglfar.

See also
 Narfi
 Váli, a son of Odin

References

Jötnar
Loki